The 2009–10 Cleveland State Vikings men's soccer team represented Cleveland State University in the 2010-11 NCAA Division I men's soccer season. The team was led by fifth-year head coach Ali Kazemaini and played their home games at Krenzler Field.

2010 squad

2010 season

Preseason Matches

Regular season

Horizon League tournament 

Cleveland State Vikings Mens Soccer Team, 2010
Cleveland State Vikings men's soccer
CleveL
Cleveland State Vikings men's s